Alexander Bonsaksen (born January 24, 1987) is a Norwegian professional ice hockey defenceman. He is currently playing with KooKoo in the Finnish Liiga.

Playing career
Bonsaksen joined the Vålerenga Ishockey organization in 2003, playing with their junior team in parts of three seasons. He made his professional debut in the GET-ligaen during the 2005–06 season. He played for Vålerenga until 2009, before moving to Sweden, where he played for Modo, Sundsvall and Rögle. He returned to Vålerenga before the 2013-14 season.

After his third season in 2016–17, with Tappara of the Finnish Liiga, Bonsaksen left as a free agent to sign a one-year contract in Germany with the Iserlohn Roosters of the DEL on April 28, 2017.

Bonsaksen was named the captain of KooKoo before the start of 2019–20 Liiga season.

International play
Bonsaksen was selected to play for the Norway men's national ice hockey team at the 2010 Winter Olympics, 2014 Winter Olympics, 2018 Winter Olympics. He has previously represented Norway at the IIHF World U18 Championships: 2005 IIHF World U18 Championship Division I. IIHF World U20 Championship: 2006, and 2007. World Ice Hockey Championships: 2009, 2010, 2011, 2012, 2013, 2014, 2015, 2017, 2018 and 2019.

Personal life
On July 27, 2018, Bonsaksen got engaged to snowboarder Silje Norendal. In 2021, she gave birth to their first child, Bianca.

Career statistics

Regular season and playoffs

International

References

External links
 

1987 births
Living people
Ice hockey players at the 2010 Winter Olympics
Ice hockey players at the 2018 Winter Olympics
Iserlohn Roosters players
KooKoo players
Modo Hockey players
Norwegian ice hockey defencemen
Olympic ice hockey players of Norway
Ice hockey players at the 2014 Winter Olympics
Rögle BK players
Ice hockey people from Oslo
IF Sundsvall Hockey players
Tappara players
Vålerenga Ishockey players